Time on My Hands is an album by pianist Duke Jordan recorded in 1985 and released on the Danish SteepleChase label.

Reception

AllMusic awarded the album 3 stars.

Track listing
 "Rosetta" (Earl Hines, Henri Woode) - 5:31
 "If I Did - Would You?" (Duke Jordan) - 4:40 Bonus track on CD reissue
 "Time on My Hands" (Harold Adamson, Mack Gordon, Vincent Youmans) - 5:44
 "As Time Goes By" (Herman Hupfeld) - 6:27
 "Tall Grass" (Jordan) - 2:52 Bonus track on CD reissue 		
 "When You're Smiling" (Mark Fisher, Joe Goodwin, Larry Shay) - 1:56
 "Dancer's Call" (Jordan) - 3:41 Bonus track on CD reissue
 "Orange Mist" (Jordan) - 3:12 Bonus track on CD reissue
 "All of Me" (Gerald Marks, Seymour Simons) - 5:32
 "I've Never Been in Love Before" (Frank Loesser) - 2:00 Bonus track on CD reissue
 "I Didn't Know What Time It Was" (Lorenz Hart, Richard Rodgers) - 4:19
 "Easy Living" (Ralph Rainger, Leo Robin) - 5:12
 "Jeepers Creepers" (Johnny Mercer, Harry Warren) - 6:22

Personnel
Duke Jordan - piano
Jesper Lundgaard - bass (tracks 1, 3, 4, 6, 9 & 11-13)
Billy Hart - drums (tracks 1, 3, 4, 6, 9 & 11-13)

References

1988 albums
Duke Jordan albums
SteepleChase Records albums